The WPB Anders ( i.e., Anders Multirole Combat Platform) is a family of medium, tracked combat vehicles. The vehicle was designed by OBRUM (  – Research and Development Centre for Mechanical Appliances) part of the Bumar Group (now Polish Armaments Group). It is named after Władysław Anders, a general of the Polish Army during World War II and later a member of the Polish government-in-exile.

History

The vehicle was designed to replace the Polish Army's remaining inventory of obsolete BWP-1 fighting vehicles family, the first prototype being publicly shown in 2010, at the MSPO Kielce defense industry exhibition. During its first presentation, the vehicle was shown in its fire support configuration, armed with a 120-mm tank gun. The media referred to this vehicle as a "light tank". Later, the same vehicle was shown configured as an infantry fighting vehicle with a KTO Rosomak Hitfist-30P turret. A more advanced IFV prototype is expected to be shown at the 2011 MSPO Kielce exhibition. Further variants, such as command and control, medical evacuation, combat-engineering and self-propelled anti-aircraft gun are also planned.

Technical details
In its basic configuration the vehicle has a STANAG 4569 protection level of 3; this can be increased to level 5 with a planned add-on armor system.

Variants

Developed by OBRUM for Polish Armed Forces as part of the Universal Modular Tracked Platform (UMTP)-family. To the date, OBRUM have been developed infantry fighting vehicle base on Anders chassis, and furthermore developing versions including engineering vehicles, command and control, ammunition wagons and medical vehicles etc.

See also
 Władysław Anders
 PT-91 Twardy
 M2 Bradley
 AIFV
 CV90
 Puma
 Warrior
 ASCOD
 Dardo
 Kentaurus
 Tulpar
 Bionix
 K21
 Type 89
 T-15 Armata
 VCTP
 Abhay
 PL-01

References

Further reading
 Altair - Polski czołg lekki 
 Altair - Propozycja Bumaru: Wielozadaniowa Platforma Bojowa Anders 
 Altair - WPB Anders 
 Altair - Anders strzela 
 Bwp Anders – następca BWP-1 
 W Bumarze-Łabędy nowa odsłona ANDERSA

External links

Anders 120mm Light Expeditionary tank technical data sheet - specifications - pictures
picture of fire support vehicle

Tanks of the post–Cold War period
Light tanks of Poland
Autoloaders
Armoured fighting vehicles of the post–Cold War period
Tracked infantry fighting vehicles
Infantry fighting vehicles of Poland